A doublet (/ˈdʌblɪt/; derived from the Ital. giubbetta) is a man's snug-fitting jacket that is shaped and fitted to the man's body. The garment was worn in Spain, and spread to the rest of Western Europe, from the late Middle Ages up to the mid-17th century. The doublet was hip length or waist length and worn over the shirt or drawers. Until the end of the 15th century, the doublet was usually worn under another layer of clothing such as a gown, mantle, overtunic or jerkin when in public.

Originally it was a mere stitched and quilted lining ("doubling"), worn under a hauberk or cuirass to prevent bruising and chafing. Doublets were sometimes opened to the waistline in a deep V. The edges might be left free or laced across the shirt front. If there was space left it might be filled with a stomacher. By the 1520s, the edges of the doublet more frequently met at the center front. Then, like many other originally practical items in the history of men's wear, from the late 15th century onward it became elaborated enough to be seen on its own.  

Throughout the 300 years of its use, the doublet served the same purpose: to give fashionable shape and padding to the body, to support the hose by providing ties, and to provide warmth to the body. The only things that changed about the doublet over its history was its style and cut.

History

The doublet developed from the padded garments worn under armour, such as the gambeson, similar to the aketon, and arming doublet.

14th and 15th centuries

Doublets of the 14th and 15th centuries were generally hip-length, sometimes shorter, worn over the shirt and hose, with a houppelande or other form of overgown. From the late 14th century, doublets were cut and padded to give the wearer an egg-shaped or pigeon-breasted silhouette, a fashion that gradually died out in favor of a flatter natural fit. In England in the late 15th century, a good doublet would have last for at least two years but many people reported their doublets to disintegrate after only four months.

16th century

Through the Tudor period, fashionable doublets remained close-fitting with baggy sleeves, and elaborate surface decoration such as pinks (patterns of small cuts in the fabric), slashes, embroidery, and applied braid. Men's doublet was worn above a shirt, and it was sometimes sleeveless or had tight or detachable sleeves. It was either made of wool or a kersey, which was a rough canvas material that would be mixed with wool. Until 1540, doublets had laces that would allow the hose to be tied to it.

In the early Elizabethan period, doublets were padded over the belly with bombast in a "pouter pigeon" or "peascod" silhouette. Sleeve attachments at the shoulder were disguised by decorative wings, tabs, or piccadills, and short skirt-like peplums or piccadills covered the waist of the hose or breeches. Padding gradually fell out of fashion again, and the doublet became close-fitting with a deep V-waistline.

In November 1590, an African servant at the Scottish court was given a doublet of shot or "changing" Spanish taffeta with 48 buttons, with breeches of orange velvet, and a hat of yellow taffeta. As a New Year Day's gift to Elizabeth I in January 1600, Elizabeth Brydges, a maid of honour, presented a doublet of network lawn, cut and tufted up with white knit-work, flourished with silver.

17th century
By the 17th century, doublets were short-waisted. A typical sleeve of this period was full and slashed to show the shirt beneath; a later style was full and paned or slashed to just below the elbow and snug below. Decorative ribbon points were pulled through eyelets on the breeches and the waist of the doublet to keep the breeches in place, and were tied in elaborate bows.

James Hay, 1st Earl of Carlisle wrote about the tight-fitting costumes worn by performers in English court masques, the fashion was "to appear very small in the waist, I remember was drawn up from the ground by both hands whilst the tailor with all his strength buttoned on my doublet".

The doublet fell permanently out of fashion in the mid-17th century when Louis XIV of France and Charles II of England established a court costume for men consisting of a long coat, a waistcoat, a cravat, a wig, and breeches—the ancestor of the modern suit.

Gallery

See also

1500–1550 in fashion
1550–1600 in fashion
1600–1650 in fashion
1650-1700 in fashion
Brigandine

References

Bibliography
 Janet Arnold: Patterns of Fashion: the cut and construction of clothes for men and women 1560-1620, pajama 1985. Revised edition 1986.

External links

15th Century Doublets

14th-century fashion
15th-century fashion
16th-century fashion
17th-century fashion
Jackets
History of clothing (Western fashion)
Medieval European costume